The 1989–90 FA Cup was the 109th season of the world's oldest football knockout competition, The Football Association Challenge Cup, or FA Cup for short. The competition started in September 1989 for teams outside the football league who played in a qualifying competition.

First round proper

Teams from the Football League Third and Fourth Division entered in this round plus four non-league teams were given byes to this round: Telford United, Macclesfield Town, Kettering Town and Sutton United. The first round of games was played over the weekend 17–19 November 1989, with a first round of replays being played on the 21st–22nd. The Bristol Rovers–Reading match went to a second replay, on the 27th.

Second round proper

The second round of games was played on 9 December 1989, with the first round of replays being played on the 12th–13th. Two games went to second replays and one of these went to a third replay.

Third round proper

Teams from the Football League First and Second Division entered in this round. The third round of games in the FA Cup was played over the weekend 6–7 January 1990, with the first set of replays being played on the 9th–10th. Two games went to second replays, which were completed the week after.

Fourth round proper

The fourth round of games was played over the weekend 27–28 January 1990, with replays being played on the 30th–31st.

Fifth round proper

The fifth set of games was played over the weekend 17–18 February 1990, with a first round of replays being played on the 21st. Each of these finished in a draw, meaning a second round of replays had to be completed.

Sixth round proper

Most of the sixth round of FA Cup games were played over the weekend 10–11 March 1990, with the Oldham Athletic – Aston Villa game and the Liverpool – QPR replay being played on the 14th.

Alex Ferguson continued to defy the odds with a Manchester United side that was struggling in the league but performing wonders in the cup, as they defeated Sheffield United 1–0.

Liverpool built up their hopes of a unique second double (which had eluded them in dramatic fashion during the previous two seasons) by beating QPR in a quarter-final replay.

Aston Villa's double hopes were ended when they crashed 3–0 to an Oldham Athletic team that hadn't played top-division football since 1923.

Cambridge United's hopes of becoming the first Fourth Division team to reach the FA Cup semi-finals were ended with a 1–0 defeat at home to Crystal Palace, who moved closer to a first FA Cup final but were first faced with the task of overcoming a Liverpool side that had crushed them 9–0 in the league earlier in the season.

Semi-finals

The semi-final matches were played on 8 April 1990.

Seven months after losing 9–0 to them in a league game, Crystal Palace found a 10-goal improvement to defeat Liverpool 4–3 and give them their first FA Cup final appearance as well as ending their opposition's hopes of a second double – the third season running that Liverpool had suffered a late blow to their double hopes.

Oldham Athletic, a Second Division side, opened the scoring against Manchester United through Earl Barrett in a game that eventually ended 3–3, forcing a replay. United won the replay 2–1.

Final

Crystal Palace, playing in their first FA Cup final, took on a Manchester United side that already had six FA Cups to its name, and a thrilling game ended 3–3 with Palace taking the lead twice and United once before a late equaliser by Mark Hughes (his second goal of the game) forced a replay.

Replay

Lee Martin, a 21-year-old defender who nearly did not play due to Alex Ferguson's doubts about his fitness, scored the winning goal as Manchester United sealed their first major trophy in five years and their first under Ferguson's management, ending months of speculation that his job was at risk due to dismal league performances.

Media coverage
For the second consecutive season in the United Kingdom, the BBC were the free to air broadcasters while Sky Sports were the subscription broadcasters.

The matches shown live on the BBC were: Nottingham Forest vs Manchester United (R3); Norwich City vs Liverpool (R4); Newcastle United vs Manchester United (R5); Queens Park Rangers vs Liverpool (QF); both Crystal Palace vs Liverpool and Manchester United vs Oldham Athletic (SF); Manchester United vs Oldham Athletic (SF replay); and Crystal Palace vs Manchester United in both the Final and its replay.

This was the first season to feature live televised semi finals; both were shown on the same Sunday afternoon with an EastEnders omnibus edition scheduled in between, though this was altered when the Liverpool vs Crystal Palace match required extra time.  The semi final replay, shown on the following Wednesday evening, coincided with ITV showing the First Division match between Arsenal and Aston Villa.  This was the first occasion on which BBC One and ITV had shown different English club matches on the same evening.  The league match kicked off twenty minutes later than the cup tie (8:05pm to 7:45pm, with the cup replay having to allow for the possibility of extra time), meaning viewers may have changed channels in time to see Aston Villa's Chris Price score the only goal.

References

External links
The FA Cup at TheFA.com
FA Cup at BBC.co.uk
FA Cup news at Reuters.co.uk

 
FA Cup seasons
Fa Cup, 1989-90
1989–90 domestic association football cups